Lamellidea biplicata is a species of air-breathing tropical land snails, terrestrial pulmonate gastropod mollusks in the family Achatinellidae. This species is endemic to Japan.

References

Molluscs of Japan
Lamellidea
Taxonomy articles created by Polbot